The following is a timeline of the protests against Donald Trump, the former president of the United States of America, businessman, and television personality.

Presidential campaign

2015
Protests against Trump began following the announcement of his candidacy in June 2015, especially after he said that illegal immigrants from Mexico were "bringing drugs, bringing crime, they're rapists".

June 16 – Trump announced his candidacy for President of the United States.
 June 29 – At a luncheon in Chicago, about 100 protesters gathered across from the City Club of Chicago to demonstrate.

 July 9 – In Washington, D.C., a group of protesters gathered outside of the future Trump International Hotel, Washington, D.C. to demonstrate and "call for a worldwide boycott of Trump properties and TV shows".
 July 10 – While Trump spoke at a Friends of Abe gathering, about 150 protesters gathered with signs and hitting piñatas made in Trump's image. A smaller group of Trump supporters gathered near the protests and caused tension, with one Trump supporter beginning to jab at protesters.
 July 12 – Protesters interrupted Trump at a speech in Phoenix, Arizona, with a large sign and were later escorted out while Trump supporters chanted "U-S-A!".
 July 23 – Trump arrived in Laredo, Texas, and was greeted by protesters while others gathered in support.
 August 11 – About 150 protesters gathered in Birch Run, Michigan outside of a rally at the Birch Run Expo Center, gathered by the Democratic Party of Michigan due to what they called "anti-immigrant, anti-veteran statements" made by Trump.
 August 25 – During a press conference, Univision anchor Jorge Ramos began to question Trump since before being called on. After being told "Sit down! you weren't called" and "Go back to Univision", Ramos continued to protest Trump's plan to deport illegal immigrants and their children born into citizenship in the U.S. Trump motioned to his security, with Keith Schiller removing Ramos from the event. Trump later met with Ramos alone.
 September 3 – Trump's chief of security, Keith Schiller, was filmed punching a protester.
 October 14 – In Richmond, Virginia, several clashes broke out between protesters and Trump supporters.
 November 7 – Over 200 protesters, many of them Latino, demonstrated outside of 30 Rockefeller Plaza, where Trump was hosting Saturday Night Live.
 December 4 – After being interrupted ten times during a speech in Raleigh, North Carolina, Trump ended his rally.
 December 12 – Multiple protesters heckled Trump during a rally in Aiken, South Carolina.
 December 22 – More than a dozen protesters were ejected from a 9,000-person Trump rally in Grand Rapids, Michigan, after interrupting the candidate's speech more than 10 times. One audience member punched a protester. Trump called the hecklers "drugged out" and "so weak" for not resisting when security guards escorted them away. Trump questioned why the protesters would heckle him in front of "a group of 9,000 maniacs that want to kill them."

2016

During the Republican primaries 

 January 4 – Protesters interrupted Trump several times in Lowell, Massachusetts, with some chanting support for Bernie Sanders and the Black Lives Matter movement.
 January 8 – During Trump's visit to Burlington, Vermont, about 700 protesters demonstrated in the City Hall Park.
 February 27 – In Valdosta, Georgia, 30 Valdosta State University students were asked to leave a college venue leased by the Trump campaign for a speech.
 February 29 – At a rally, veteran photojournalist Chris Morris was grabbed by his throat and thrown to the ground by a member of the Secret Service.

 March 1 – Kashiya Nwanguma attended a Trump rally in Louisville, Kentucky, with two anti-Trump signs. She reported that Trump supporters ripped her signs away and shouted insults at her.
 March 10 – As Trump was being led by police from a rally in Fayetteville, North Carolina, a protester was punched by a Trump supporter. Charges of assault and battery were filed by the Cumberland County Sheriff's Office. A protester being led by police from a rally in Fayetteville, North Carolina, was sucker punched by John McGraw, a Trump supporter. McGraw later told the media that the next time he saw the protester, "we might have to kill him." McGraw was subsequently charged with assault and battery and given 12 months of probation. On Meet the Press, Trump said that he had instructed his team to look into paying McGraw's legal fees and said, "He obviously loves his country."
 March 11 – During a rally in St. Louis, at which Trump was "repeatedly interrupted by protesters, violence broke out between supporters of Trump and protesters, resulting in 32 arrests." A planned event for later that day in Chicago drew confrontations between supporters and protesters in the arena at the University of Illinois at Chicago before Trump could come out to speak, due to an unusually large number of protesters, and the campaign cancelled the rally due to safety concerns. Trump stated that he made the decision himself, commenting, "I didn't want to see people get hurt [so] I decided to postpone the rally."
 March 12 – Thomas Dimassimo, a 32-year-old man, attempted to rush the stage as Trump was speaking at a rally in Dayton, Ohio. Dimassimo was stopped by Secret Service agents and subsequently charged with misdemeanor disorderly conduct and inducing panic.
 March 13 – Trump refused to take responsibility for clashes at his campaign events, criticized protesters who have dogged his rallies, and demanded that police begin to arrest rally protesters. His Kansas City rally was interrupted repeatedly by protesters in the arena while protesters outside the event were pepper sprayed by police. In an effort to dissuade future protesters, Trump may begin to request that protesters be arrested "[b]ecause then their lives are going to be ruined."
 March 17 – During an interview with CNN, Trump predicted "you'd have riots" if were denied the Republican nomination despite having the most delegates at the convention.
 March 18 – Between 500 and 600 people engaged in a standoff outside of a rally in Salt Lake City, Utah. Police officers formed a human barricade to separate the two groups, who largely remained nonviolent. Toward the end of the rally, protesters tore down a security tent at a Trump rally in Utah and threw rocks at rally attendees as they left. Two people unsuccessfully attempted to breach the entrance of the venue. Secret Service officers secured the inside of the venue and roughly 40 police officers in riot gear repelled the protesters from entering the building. No arrests were made.
 March 19 – Thousands of anti-Trump protesters in New York chanted "Fuck Trump!" and "Donald Trump, Go away!" as they rallied around the Trump International Tower building near 60th St. and Columbus Circle. The group was followed by dozens of NYPD officers who lined the streets with metal barricades and blocked the protesters path as they tried to cross busy intersections. After violence broke out, police pepper-sprayed the crowd, whom police refused to let cross the street. During a simultaneous protest, protesters blocked a highway leading to Trump's Fountain Hills, Arizona rally, leading to three arrests.

 April 14 – Hundreds of protesters gathered in a New York City Hyatt hotel against the wishes of the hotel staff.
 April 28 – Several hundred protesters in Costa Mesa, California, clashed with police and Trump supporters outside the OC Fair & Event Center, where Trump was holding a rally. Seventeen people were arrested and five police cars were damaged.
 April 29 – Around 1,000 to 3,000 protested in the area surrounding Burlingame, California, where Trump was to give a speech at the California GOP convention. Protesters rushed security gates at one point. Activists blocked a main intersection outside the event and vandalized a police car. Eventually, the police restored order in the area. For safety reasons, Trump himself was forced to climb over a wall and enter through a back entrance of the venue.
 May 1 – Thousands of May Day demonstrators marched in downtown Los Angeles on Sunday, some speaking out in support of workers and immigrants, others criticizing Trump. LAPD Sergeant Barry Montgomery told The Los Angeles Times that no one was arrested. Some protesters carried a big inflatable figure of Trump holding a Ku Klux Klan hood in his right hand.

After Trump won the primaries 

 May 7 – Protesters shouting "Love Trumps Hate" met Trump supporters before his second rally in Washington. Many protesters outside spoke out against Trump's words and policy stances regarding women, Hispanics, and Muslims, including his plan to build a wall between the U.S. and Mexico. Later in the day, a group of protesters blocked a road near where Trump was supposed to speak, hoping to keep him from reaching the location. According to authorities, "a small number of arrests" were made.
 May 24 – Following a rally in Albuquerque, New Mexico, protesters began throwing rocks and bottles at police and police horses, smashed a glass door at the convention center, and burned a number of Trump signs and flags, filling the street with smoke. Video footage of the incident also showed protesters jumping on top of several police cars.
 May 25 – Anti-Trump protesters were arrested after clashing with Trump supporters in Anaheim who alleged the protesters were "illegals" and were "going to burn in Hell."
 May 27 – Anti-Trump protesters clashed with Trump supporters and with police after a Trump rally ended in San Diego. Protesters waved Mexican flags and signs supporting Bernie Sanders. Some protesters were arrested when they attempted to push past railings separating them from the Convention Center where Trump was speaking. The clashes, largely verbal and resulting in no injuries or property damage, began after the Trump rally ended and his supporters poured into the street. Individuals on both sides shouted and threw trash and the occasional punch, but no injuries or property damage were reported. Police then declared the protest an illegal assembly and ordered the crowd to disperse. Further arrests were made when some members of the crowd failed to disperse. A total of 35 people were arrested in that protest.
 June 2 – Protests and riots occurred outside a Trump rally in San Jose, California. During a series of protests, hundreds of anti-Trump protesters waving Mexican flags climbed on cars, and harassed supporters of Donald Trump. There were reports of violence including instances of bottles being thrown and assaults against Trump supporters. A police officer was assaulted. At least one American flag was burned by protesters. Video footage went viral of a female Trump supporter being pelted by eggs thrown by protesters. The violence and police inaction was decried at San Jose City Hall later that month.
 June 10 – Anti-Trump protesters and Trump supporters clashed outside a rally in Richmond, Virginia. One Trump supporter was punched and several protesters were pushed to the ground by police. Five people were arrested but only one was charged.
 June 16 – A photographer for the Dallas Advocate was hit on head with a rock that had been thrown from a crowd outside a Dallas rally that included both Trump supporters and protesters.
 June 19 – During a rally in Las Vegas, Michael Sandford, a 20-year-old British national, was arrested for assault and held in the county jail until he was arraigned in federal court and charged with "an act of violence on restricted grounds". He was accused of attempting to seize a police officer's firearm and later claiming he intended to kill Trump. A British citizen, he was in the U.S. illegally and is being held without bond. He has since then pleaded guilty to federal charges of being an illegal alien in possession of a firearm and disrupting an official function.
 July 1 – Three people were arrested after a conflict occurred between Trump supporters and anti-Trump protesters outside the Western Conservative Summit. According to The Gazette, a man grabbed pro-Trump bumper stickers from a woman selling them outside Denver's convention center, ripped some of them, and threw them in her face. A pushing match then ensued, with many people spilling into the street.

After the official nomination 

 August 4 – Protesters stood silently among seated attendees at a Portland, Maine Trump rally, and held up pocket Constitutions, in reference to Khizr Khan's DNC speech days earlier. The protesters were ejected from the rally.
 August 19 – Dozens of protestors gathered in front and marched around the building where a fundraiser for Trump was held in Minneapolis. "Later in the evening, a smaller contingent grew unruly. Some fundraiser attendees were pushed and jostled, spit on and verbally harassed as they left the convention center."
 August 31 – A group of approximately 500 people protested in downtown Phoenix, Arizona, chanting and hitting a Trump piñata. There were no arrests, although police had to usher two anti-Trump protesters off the sidewalk where speech-goers for a Trump rally entered the Phoenix Convention Center, saying that the protesters were causing conflict with the Trump supporters.
 October 10 – Dave Eggers and Jordan Kurland launched the all-star music project 30 Days, 30 Songs, scheduled to publish one song per day advocating against Donald Trump. Due to overwhelming response of more artists, the project was meanwhile renamed and rescheduled to 30 Days, 40 Songs and 30 Days, 50 Songs. Musicians include stars like R.E.M., Moby, Franz Ferdinand, Jimmy Eat World, Loudon Wainwright and many others.
 October 18 – Dozens of women, some of whom were victims of sexual assault, gathered in front of Trump Tower on a Tuesday morning to begin a series of protests across the nation pushing women to leave the Republican party and un-endorse Donald Trump. Dressed in black, the protesters sat in front of Trump Tower holding signs such as "Grab my pussy, muthafucker I dare you" and "Don't tread on my pussy" in reference to the Donald Trump and Billy Bush recording.
 October 26 – Trump's star on the Hollywood Walk of Fame was destroyed with a sledgehammer and a pickaxe. The man responsible pleaded no contest to one count of felony vandalism and was sentenced to three years of probation in February 2017.
 November 5 – During a rally at the Reno-Sparks Convention Center in Reno, Nevada, Trump was rushed off stage by Secret Service agents when someone yelled "gun" while others tried to take a protester's anti-Trump sign. The protester was questioned and found to have no weapons on him. Trump returned minutes later to resume his rally.

Post-election 

Following the announcement of Trump's election victory, large protests broke out across the United States including other countries such as Canada, United Kingdom, France, Germany, Philippines, Australia, Israel with some continuing for several days, and more protests planned for the following weeks and months.

November 9

 {| border=1 style="border-collapse:collapse; float:center;" cellpadding=3
|- style="background:#ccc;"
!Locations of protests against Donald Trump on November 9, 2016
|-
|

|}
 Thousands of protesters took to the street in Chicago. Chicago Tribune explains that the protest was "relatively peaceful" and was "devoid of any of the heavy vandalism of effigy burning that occurred elsewhere." Five people were arrested in total.

 Atlanta, Georgia
 Boston, Massachusetts
 Cleveland, Ohio
 Dallas, Texas
 Detroit, Michigan
 Houston, Texas
 Los Angeles, California
 Miami, Florida
 New York City, New York
 Oakland, California
 Omaha, Nebraska
 Philadelphia, Pennsylvania
 Portland, Oregon
 Richmond, Virginia
 San Diego, California
 San Francisco, California
 San Jose, California
 Seattle, Washington
 Washington, D.C.
 Winston-Salem, North Carolina

 Protests also occurred at various universities, including:

 Arizona State University
 Fisk University
 University of Kentucky
 University of Michigan
 University of Pittsburgh

 High school and college students walked out of classes to protest. The protests were mostly peaceful, although at some protests fires were lit, flags were burned, and a Trump piñata was burned.

 Celebrities such as Madonna, Cher, and Lady Gaga took part in New York. Some protesters took to blocking freeways in Los Angeles, San Diego, and Portland, Oregon, and were dispersed by police in the early hours of the morning. One protester was hit by a car. In a number of cities, protesters were dispersed with rubber bullets, pepper spray and bean-bags fired by police. While protests ended at 3am in New York City, calls were made to continue the protests over the coming days.

November 10

 As Trump held the first transition meeting with President Obama at the White House, protesters were outside. Protests continued in cities across the United States. International protests were held in London, Vancouver, and Manila. Los Angeles mayor Eric Garcetti expressed understanding of the protests and praised those who peacefully wanted to make their voices heard.

 In Austin, Texas, a young girl rallied protesters behind the mantra: "I am a female, I am mixed race, I am a child and I cannot vote. But that will not stop me from getting heard" after which chants of "Love is love, and love trumps hate" followed. In Los Angeles, protesters continued blocking freeways. A peaceful protest turned violent when a small group began rioting and attacking police in Portland, Oregon. The protests in Portland attracted over 4,000 people and remained largely peaceful, but took to the highway and blocked traffic. Acts of vandalism including a number of smashed windows, vandalized vehicles, and a dumpster fire caused police to declare a riot. Protesters tried to retain the peaceful nature of the protest and chanted "peaceful protest".

 Protests were held in the following cities:

 Chicago, Illinois
 Dallas, Texas
 Grand Rapids, Michigan
 Greensboro, North Carolina
 Louisville, Kentucky
 Madison, Wisconsin
 Milwaukee, Wisconsin
 Minneapolis, Minnesota
 New York City, New York
 Philadelphia, Pennsylvania
 Pittsburg, California
 Portland, Oregon
 Richmond, Virginia
 Tampa, Florida

 Numerous petitions were started to prevent Trump from taking office, including a Change.org petition started by Elijah Berg of North Carolina requesting that faithless electors in states that Trump won vote for Clinton instead, which surpassed three million signatures.

November 11
 Protests occurred in the following cities:

 Anchorage, Alaska
 Atlanta, Georgia
 Bakersfield, California
 Burlington, Vermont
 Columbia, South Carolina
 Columbus, Ohio
 Dallas, Texas
 Denver, Colorado
 Des Moines, Iowa
 Eugene, Oregon
 Fort Worth, Texas
 Grand Rapids, Michigan
 Iowa City, Iowa
 Los Angeles, California
 Nashville, Tennessee
 New Haven, Connecticut
 New York, New York
 Olympia, Washington
 Orlando, Florida
 Royal Oak, Michigan
 San Antonio, Texas

 Protests also occurred at the following schools:

 Ohio State University
 State University of New York at New Paltz
 Texas State University
 University of Illinois at Urbana–Champaign
 University of Massachusetts Amherst
 University of Miami
 University of North Carolina, Greensboro
 University of North Carolina, Wilmington
 University of Pacific
 University of Rochester
 Vanderbilt University
 Virginia Commonwealth University
 Wayne State University
 Wesleyan University

 A protest also occurred at the U.S. embassy in Tel Aviv, Israel. The American and Mexican national soccer teams also posed together in a Unity Wall in response to Trump's election before their World Cup qualifying match in Columbus, Ohio.

November 12

 During a peaceful march in Oregon in the early hours of November 12, one protester was shot by an unknown assailant. Police in Portland, Oregon, said that they arrested over twenty people after protesters refused to disperse.

 On the first weekend day after the election, a march of over 10,000 people in Los Angeles went from MacArthur Park and shut down the busy Wilshire Blvd corridor. In New York City, another crowd cited by NBC News as 25,000 marched from Union Square to Trump Tower. In Chicago, thousands of people marched through The Loop. In Indianapolis, about 500 people gathered at the Statehouse, then proceeded to march downtown. Protesters split off into several groups, some of which moved to the streets and blocked traffic. Some protesters were allegedly throwing rocks at police officers, who responded by firing non-lethal weapons.

 International protests also occurred in cities such as Berlin, Germany, Melbourne, Australia and Perth, Australia and Auckland, New Zealand.

November 13
 Protests continued in the following cities:

 Chicago, Illinois
 Denver, Colorado
Erie, Pennsylvania
Fort Lauderdale, Florida
Los Angeles, California
Manchester, New Hampshire
New Haven, Connecticut
New York City, New York
Oakland, California
Philadelphia, Pennsylvania
Royal Oak, Michigan
San Francisco, California
Springfield, Massachusetts
San Antonio, Texas

 In Atlanta, the words "FUCK TRUMP" were projected onto the side of a high-rise hotel by the Metro Atlanta Democratic Socialists of America.

International protests occurred in cities including Toronto, Ontario, Canada, where about a thousand people gathered in Nathan Phillips Square.

November 14
 A group of 40 protesters in Washington, D.C., staged a sit-in at the office of prospective Senate minority leader Charles Schumer, in an effort to change Democratic leadership and prevent the party's collaboration with Trump. Seventeen arrests were made at that sit-in.
 At a small protest at Ohio State University, protest leader Timothy Adams was attacked from behind and knocked down to the steps he was standing on, breaking his bullhorn and glasses.
 Several school districts experienced walkouts from high school students, many of them too young to have voted.

November 15 – Protests occurred in the following cities and universities:

 Akron, Ohio
 Beltsville, Maryland
 Kalamazoo, Michigan
 Montgomery County, Maryland
 New York City
 Santa Barbara, California
 Washington, D.C.
 La Salle University
 Penn State University
 Rutgers University
 St. Mary's College of California
 Stanford University
 University of California, Riverside
 University of Chicago
 University of Illinois at Chicago

November 16
 Student protests continued for a third day in Montgomery County, Maryland.
 Students around the country walked out of classes in an effort to push their schools to declare themselves a "sanctuary campus" from Trump's planned immigration policy of mass deportations. The Stanford, Rutgers, and St. Mary's protests on November 15 were among the first. Rutgers president Robert Barchi responded that the school will protect the privacy of its undocumented immigrants. California State University chancellor Timothy P. White made a similar affirmation. Iowa State University reaffirmed continuation of their already existing policy.
 Around 350 Harvard University faculty members signed a letter urging the administration to denounce hate speech, protect student privacy, reaffirm admissions and financial aid policies and to make the university a sanctuary. One of the first to sign the letter was Henry Louis Gates Jr.
 The letters of Trump's name were removed from three buildings in Manhattan, including Trump Place due to angered residents.

November 17

 In the early morning in Los Angeles, protesters chanted "Fire Bannon" in reference to Trump appointing Steve Bannon as chief White House strategist and senior counselor on Sunday. Bannon denied accusations of his being a white nationalist, saying "I'm a nationalist."
 Two students were arrested at a protest at the University of Pittsburgh
 A rally was held at the University of Miami
 Around 100 students protested at Portland State University

November 18

 Various protests occurred in Augusta, Maine, Chapel Hill, North Carolina, Cleveland, Ohio, Prince George's County, Maryland, Sacramento, California, and Washington, D.C.
 Vice President-elect Mike Pence attended the musical Hamilton in New York City, where he was addressed by the cast.

November 19

 About 3,000 formed a hand holding ring around Green Lake in Seattle, Washington.
 In Chicago, approximately 2,000 protesters marched from Federal Plaza to Trump Tower Chicago.
 Several hundred protesters rallied and marched in downtown San Francisco.
 In New York City, three separate protests converged on the heavily secured area surrounding Trump Tower in New York City, where security guided them into a demonstration pen that had been erected outside of the president elect's offices and residence. One group marched from Queens. One group protesting Trump's appointment of Bannon marched from Washington Square Park. A smaller but more dramatic group wearing stage special effects makeup of wounds and scars, marched from Union Square to indicate the damage a Trump administration will have on "marginalized people" including women.
 International protests occurred in Toronto, Ontario, Canada; Melbourne, Australia; and Paris, France.

November 20
 A 69-year-old man dressed in a U.S. Marine uniform set himself alight in the Highland Square in Akron, Ohio, after ranting about the need to protest Trump's election. He was hospitalized in stable condition.
 A protest in Brooklyn Heights attracted Adam Horovitz to Adam Yauch Park (a park named after his late-Beastie Boys bandmate), where multiple spray-painted swastikas and the message "Go Trump" had been discovered two days before. At the protest, Horovitz released a statement against Trump.
 An anti-Trump group called "Not Up For Grabs: Portland" marched in Portland, Oregon.
 During a live performance on the American Music Awards of 2016, Green Day performed their new song Bang Bang. In the middle of the song, lead singer Billie Joe Armstrong included the anti-Trump chant "No Trump, no KKK, no fascist USA!"

November 21
 A rally was held outside the Rhode Island State House in Providence, Rhode Island.
 A protest was held in front of the Ohio Statehouse in Columbus, Ohio.
 Protests continued outside Portland City Hall in Portland, Oregon, and a march was held later in the evening.

November 22 – Students at Christopher Newport University protested.

November 23 – A protest occurred in Minneapolis, Minnesota. The protesters called for President Obama to pardon all immigrants before the end of his term.
November 25 – On Black Friday, protesters blocked entrances to stores on the Magnificent Mile in Chicago.
November 26 – A small protest occurred at Pioneer Courthouse Square in Portland, Oregon. Protester Bobby Lang said, "It's either sit in horror or go out and do things."
November 27 – A protest occurred at the Nebraska State Capitol building. The crowd was estimated at around 200 people.
 December 8 – There was controversy about the inaugural permitting for protests. Hundreds of thousands of people have organized on Facebook to attend. Partnership for Civil Justice Fund for the A.N.S.W.E.R. Coalition has a lawsuit pending about protest near the Trump Hotel.
 December 18 – On International Migrants Day approximately 2,000 people marched peacefully in downtown Los Angeles against Trump's policies on immigration, the environment and healthcare.
 December 19 – On the day the United States Electoral College convened protests were held at numerous state capitols, including but not limited to those of Ohio, Pennsylvania, Wisconsin, Tennessee, and Idaho.
 January 3 – Five men, including NAACP president Cornell William Brooks, and one woman held a sit-in at Jeff Sessions' office in Mobile, Alabama, intending to stay until Sessions withdrew his name for consideration as United States Attorney General or they were arrested. The sit-in started at 11am and ended at 6:30pm when the protesters were arrested.
 January 14 – About 2,000 protesters, most of them African-American, marched through rain near the Martin Luther King Jr. Memorial to demand protection of civil rights and voting rights.
 January 19
 The night before the inauguration, hundreds of people protested outside the Trump International Hotel and Tower in New York City.
 During the DeploraBall in Washington, D.C., hundreds of anti-Trump protesters demonstrated outside of the National Press Building.

During Trump's presidency

January 2017 

 January 20 – Fifty women from El Paso, Texas and Ciudad Juárez, demonstrated against the proposed wall and the Trump Administration immigration policies by standing on the US/Mexico border, linked by hands and braiding scarves or hair together between 7am and 9am. The women were part of an organization called Boundless Across Borders.
January 20, inauguration – Multiple protests took place in connection with the inauguration of Donald Trump as the president of the United States of America.

January 21, Women's Marches – A series of political rallies known as Women's Marches took place in locations around the world. Estimates suggest between 3.3 and 4.6 million people took part, making it the largest protest in United States history.
January 25 – Seven Greenpeace members climbed a construction crane belonging to Clark Construction and displayed a large banner saying "Resist", blocking traffic and interrupting work on a new office building a half-mile from The White House.

January 28 – Protests occurred at airports across the US, including O'Hare International Airport in Chicago, JFK Airport in New York, SFO in San Francisco, LAX in Los Angeles and Dallas/Fort Worth International Airport.
January 29 – Protests against executive order 13769, banning travelers and refugees from certain countries continue at airports and public spaces, continue in the United States and internationally.
January 30 – A protest occurred at the U.S. Consulate in Toronto, Canada in the wake of Trump's executive order on immigration. A demonstration by Democrats was held outside of the Supreme court to protest the executive order. Across major cities in the United Kingdom, large crowds varying from over 200 people, protested against the Trump Administration's order on banning travellers and refugees from certain countries, as well supporting the petition to ban the Trump state visit to the U.K, which gathered over one million signatures in two days.
January 31 – Protests against Executive Order 13769 continue. In Las Cruces, New Mexico, demonstrators showed up outside the Islamic Center to show support for the Muslim community.

February 2017

February 2 – Yemeni business owners in New York City shut down their various businesses from noon until 8 pm to protest Executive Order 13769. Thousands of Comcast employees in Portland, Washington, D.C., Philadelphia and Sunnyvale walked off the job in protest of the same executive order. An LGBT anti-Trump rally was held in West Hollywood. Some Baltimore residents protested both against this executive order and against "alleged drafts of orders" that might target LGBT rights.
February 3 – Mock vigils for the Bowling Green massacre, a fictitious event accidentally created by Kellyanne Conway while defending executive order 13769 took place in Bowling Green, Kentucky and at Bowling Green train station in New York City. An LGBT "dance protest" was held outside the Trump International Hotel in downtown Washington, D.C., with several hundred participants.

February 4 – Protests occurred near Trump's Mar-a-Lago estate in Palm Beach. Between 1,200 and 2,000 protesters attended, starting outside Trump Plaza and continuing on Flagler Drive. Protests also occurred in Toronto, San Francisco, and London against the travel ban. The London protest also objected to Trump's upcoming state visit. Outside of the Stonewall Inn, thousands of LGBTQ supporters protested against Trump.
February 5 – Protests outside of Super Bowl LI took place in Houston. Hundreds attended a march going from Hermann Park to NRG Stadium. In Los Angeles, around 1,500 demonstrators protested against the Dakota and Keystone XL pipeline project.
February 6 – Around 200 people protested outside of the Trump International Hotel in Manhattan against Executive Order 13769. Twenty rabbis were arrested in the protest.
February 7 – Protesters in New York marched outside of Goldman Sachs' headquarters to protest "Wall Street's involvement in President Donald Trump's administration."
February 10 – Thousands of protesters in Iran demonstrated against Trump in Azadi Square on the anniversary of the Islamic Revolution.
 February 11 – Thousands gather at Ocean Beach in San Francisco and spell out the word "Resist !!", with overflow crowds creating an underline. In Scotland, protesters in Edinburgh demonstrate against Trump. Protests also occurred in Prague. Thousands protested in Raleigh in support of LGBT rights and against Trump.
 February 12 – Thousands in cities across Mexico took to the streets in protest against Trump's attitude towards Mexicans and his proposed border wall. Hundreds of protesters in Chicago lined up along the Chicago River and then mooned Trump Tower.
 February 13 – The "Day Without Latinos" strike in Milwaukee protested both Trump-supporter, Sheriff David Clarke and the Trump administration's aggressive moves on immigrants. Students at Howard University protested Betsy DeVos's visit to the campus and have asked campus administration to block President Trump from visiting.
 February 14 – A protest against the Trump administration took place in Rochester.
 February 16 – A Day Without Immigrants took place around the United States where immigrants stayed home from school, work and did not spend money in order to show their impact on society. The protest was in response to the Trump administration's stance on immigration and increased federal raids.

February 17 – General strike (see also: Day Without Immigrants 2017), prior to President's Day. Hundreds of people demonstrated against the Trump administration in Washington Square Park.
February 18 – Anti-Trump protesters demonstrated in a peaceful protest outside of a Trump rally held at the Melbourne-Orlando International Airport. In New York, a staged funeral to "mourn the death of the U.S. presidency took place in Washington Square Park.
February 19 – Over 1,000 people participated in the "I Am a Muslim Too" rally at Times Square. The event was organized by Russell Simmons and several religious leaders of different faiths. Boston held a rally in support of science and the environment.

February 20 – Not My Presidents Day, thousands of protesters in cities around the country demonstrated against Trump.
February 21 – Protesters participated in a "Resist Trump Tuesday" protest in Chicago where 8 clergy members of different faiths were arrested.
February 22 – After the Trump administration rescinded the protections for transgender students to use school restrooms that correspond to their gender identity, protests took place. There were around 200 people demonstrating in front of the White House in support of transgender students' rights. The city council of Richmond, California passed a resolution which supported an investigation of Trump in relation to the Foreign Emoluments Clause of the Constitution.
February 24 – The United Talent Agency (UTA), which had already cancelled its Oscars party, hosted a rally against Trump, called "United Voices". The event helped raise $320,000 for the ACLU and the International Rescue Committee. At the rally were Jodie Foster, Michael J. Fox, Keegan-Michael Key and other celebrities. There were nearly 2,000 attendees.
February 27 – A peaceful protest that stopped some traffic occurred in Minneapolis in the evening. The protest drew between 150 and 200 demonstrators who protested Trump and were in support of $15 minimum wage.
February 28 – Protesters in Vancouver demonstrated anti-Trump sentiment during the grand opening of the Trump hotel in Vancouver. Outside the White House, despite pouring rain, Rosie O'Donnell led a few hundred protesters against Trump.

March 2017
March 1 – Protests against Trump using the hashtag, #CampusResistance, occurred on college campuses across the United States.
March 2 – Employees of the Environmental Protection Agency (EPA) protested proposed budget cuts for their department. There were a "few dozen" protesters at the Federal Plaza in Chicago.
March 3 – Around 1,000 protesters in Chicago demonstrated for transgender rights and against the Trump administration. In Palm Beach, around 100 protesters demonstrated against Trump, and one protester was arrested and given a traffic ticket and then released.
March 4 – Counter-protesters at Pro-Trump rallies (Spirit of America) occurred on March 4, with one protest, at Berkeley, becoming a violent clash between pro and anti-Trump groups. Ten people were arrested in connection with the violence and the protest briefly shut down the BART station at Berkeley. In Minneapolis, anti-Trump and pro-Trump supporters also clashed and six people were arrested for setting off firecrackers.
March 6 – A rally held outside of the White House against the new travel ban. Tom Perez was one of the speakers.
March 8 – A Day Without a Woman, a call for women not to work on International Women's Day.
March 10 – Thousands of protesters marched from the US Army Corps of Engineers headquarters to the White House to protest the Dakota Pipeline decision by Trump.
March 12 – In Baltimore, several groups protested the revised travel ban. On Sunday morning, an anonymous environmental group carved the message "NO MORE TIGERS. NO MORE WOODS." into the greens of the Trump National Golf Club in Rancho Palos Verdes. On the same day, in Brentwood, Los Angeles, roughly 50–60 people protested outside the offices of Breitbart News aiming to "hold the Trump Administration accountable for its unprecedented assault on the free press."
March 14 – Tech industry workers protested Trump's policies on Pi Day. There were a few hundred protesters in Palo Alto.
March 15 – Hundreds of protesters demonstrated outside of a Trump rally in Nashville. A physician, Carol Paris, interrupted the rally with a sign reading "Improved Medicare for All" and when she was met with boos from the crowd, Trump stopped speaking and she was asked to leave. In Detroit, about 300 protesters demonstrated at the Willow Run Airport and denounced Trump's environmental policies.
March 17 – A small protest against Trump took in took place in Aspen. In New York, the "Irish Stand" event took place. It was led by Aodhán Ó Riordáin in Riverside Church and opposed Trump's stance on immigration.
March 18 – Protests in London, Cardiff and Glasgow against Brexit and Trump's "anti-migrant hysteria".
March 20 – Hundreds of protesters on Monday waved signs and gave fiery speeches at the gates to Freedom Hall ahead President Donald Trump's visit to tout his plan to replace Obamacare, booing as Air Force One passed overhead for landing.
March 21 – In opposition to "Trump Care", around 300 protesters held a "die-in" outside of the office of Representative Darrell Issa in Vista, California.
March 25 – Trump supporters clashed with Protesters after the Trump supporters path were blocked by the protesters.
March 28 – Anti-Trump Protesters Gather Outside Senator Cornyn's Houston Office and voice their opinion.

April 2017

April 1 – Hundreds of protesters showed up for a "dance party" protest outside of Ivanka Trump's Washington, D.C. home.
April 2 – Around 300 people, both pro and anti Trump came to a rally at Esther Short Park.
April 3 – Protesters displayed a banner with the words "Impeach Trump" at the opening day game at Nationals Park.
April 4 – Movie theaters across the United States and in five other countries screened 1984 in a protest against Donald Trump.
April 9 – More than 3,000 people came to the Dallas MegaMarch demonstration to protest Trump's immigration policies. Protests against Trump's strike on Syria occurred in Milwaukee.
April 10 – Children and young adults from the group, We Belong Together, start their spring break trip to Washington, D.C., to protest Trump. They first protested on Monday outside of Mayor Carlos Gimenez's office because the mayor of Miami-Dade County has agreed to work with Trump.
April 11 – Protests against both Trump and Representative Marsha Blackburn took place in Clarksville, Tennessee.
April 12 – The "first protest in space" was carried out by the Autonomous Space Agency Network (ASAN) by printing a tweet against Trump and flown into the near-space atmosphere.
April 13 – Around 25 protesters from the group, "Rise and Resist" were arrested while protesting immigration policies at Trump Tower. Around 200 young people and other activists from We Belong Together protested in front of the White House.
April 15 – The Tax March demanded that Donald Trump release his tax returns. Thousands attended rallies and marches held throughout the U.S. At least 21 people were arrested as Trump supporters and opponents clashed Saturday at the Civic Center Park in Berkeley, California, police said. Another eleven people were also injured.
April 18 – Protesters came to Snap-on Inc. in Kenosha, Wisconsin, to urge Trump to release his tax returns. President Trump was there to sign an executive order.
April 22 – March for Science – "Crowds massed in the US capital and around the world on Earth Day to support science and evidence-based research – a protest partly fueled by opposition to President Trump's threats of budget cuts to agencies funding scientists' work."
April 29 – People's Climate Mobilization, environmental activists planned out rallies and marches in Washington, D.C., and throughout the United States, which are attended by thousands.

May 2017
May 1 – Immigration rights strike and protest were planned. The 2017 May Day protests took place across the country.
May 3 – Demonstrators rallied outside the White House to protest executive order 13798, Promoting Free Speech and Religious Liberty.
May 4 – A protest took place in New York when Trump returned to the city for the first time since he took office. A protest took place at the Wallace Bennett Federal Building in Salt Lake City after the House passage of the American Health Care Act (AHCA).
May 10 – A protest against Trump took place outside of the White House where demonstrators called for an independent prosecutor and for Trump's impeachment. Betsy DeVos was booed and students turned their back to her when she gave a commencement speech at Bethune-Cookman University.
May 11 – Protesters in Butte gathered to demonstrated against Donald Trump, Jr. and Greg Gianforte. Around 150 protesters in San Diego protested against Trump and the GOP.
May 13 – Around 200 protesters spelled out the word "Resist!" with their bodies on Trump National Golf Course in Rancho Palos Verdes, California. Around a hundred protesters demonstrated in Lynchburg against Trump's Liberty University address. Protesters in South Florida demonstrated in Little Haiti against the deportation of Haitian refugees.
May 15 – Protesters in Seattle rallied in front of the federal courthouse in opposition to the travel ban. In Washington, D.C., artist Robin Bell used a video projector to project words onto the Trump International Hotel, where many foreign businessmen and diplomats stay. Phrases shown included "PAY TRUMP BRIBES HERE" and "EMOLUMENTS WELCOME" (a reference to the controversy over Trump and the Foreign Emoluments clause.
May 20 – Protests took place in Yemen in opposition of Trump's visit to Saudi Arabia. Thousands of demonstrators aligned with Houthi rebels marched through Sana'a.
May 23 – Thousands of demonstrators in Gaza supporting the Popular Front for the Liberation of Palestine (PFLP) protested Trump's visit to Bethlehem. Protesters in Rome demonstrated against Trump's visit to the Vatican. Hundreds of students walked out on Mike Pence's commencement speech at Notre Dame in order to protest Trump administration policies.
May 24 – Around 9,000 people in Brussels attended a rally against Trump who called the city a "hellhole". Belgians at the protest indicated that he was not welcome and that they were against "his war agenda".
May 27 – A protest took place near the location of the G-7 summit in Giardini Naxos.

June 2017
June 1 – Protesters demonstrated in front of the White House against Trump's pullout from the Paris Climate Agreement.
June 3 – Thousands of protesters participated in the March for Truth.

July 2017
July 2 – "Impeachment March" rallies in several major U.S. cities advocated for U.S. Congress to start the impeachment process for Trump.
July 4 – An anti-Trump rally coinciding with Independence Day called "We Will Not Be Banned" protests Trump's immigration policies at Trump Tower.

August 2017
August 13 – Thousands protest in New York City as President Trump returns to Trump Tower for the first time since January 19
August 19 – Responses to the 2017 Unite the Right Rally took place in various cities. In particular in Boston, 40,000 people counter-protested the Boston Free Speech rally.

August 22 – Thousands protest in Phoenix outside the Phoenix convention center while President Trump visits to make a campaign rally speech in the Phoenix Convention Center.
August 26 – Thousands protested Trump in California outside the Los Angeles City Hall while Congresswoman Judy Chu lead a rally as Keynote Speaker in support of the Indivisible March on Women's Equality Day that was dedicated to Heather Heyer. The Indivisible March was founded by Indivisible Suffragists, one of over 6,000 Indivisible Groups nationwide, with similar events that was co-organized in Alaska, District of Columbia, Georgia, Hawaii, Indiana, Minnesota, Nevada, Pennsylvania, Utah, Washington and West Virginia.

September 2017
September 5 – Thousands protest throughout the country in response to the termination of the Deferred Action for Childhood Arrivals program.
September 19 – Ten people, including Congressman Raúl Grijalva, Congressman Luis Gutiérrez, Congressman Adriano Espaillat, and Speaker Melissa Mark-Viverito of the New York City Council are arrested protesting in front of Trump Tower.
September 24 – Hundreds of players throughout the National Football League protest during the national anthem.

November 2017
November 10 – In the Philippines, militant groups stage protests against Trump, who will be visiting in the country for the 2017 ASEAN Summit.
November 21 – In Palm Beach, hundreds protest outside Mar-a-Lago before President Trump arrives over the termination of Temporary Protected Status.

January 2018
January 15 – Hundreds protest in Times Square against President Trump on Martin Luther King Jr. Day.
January 20 – Hundreds of thousands protested during the 2018 Women's March, on the first day of a government shutdown.
January 29 – People's State of the Union joint protest.

June 2018
Protests against family separation in U.S. immigration enforcement took place throughout May, June and July.

July 2018

July 13 – Protests in several UK cities, during Trump's visit to London, including flying the Donald Trump baby balloon.
July 17 – Occupy Lafayette Park "Kremlin Annex" protest.  Protesters first gathered outside the White House as Trump returned from his summit with Russian president Vladimir Putin in Helsinki, yelling "traitor", and assuming the metaphor whereby the White House had become an annex of the Kremlin.  The protest has become a continuous daily event in operation for over 109 days as of November 1, 2018, featuring musicians and celebrities on an amplified speaking platform.

August 2018
August 13 – Trump spoke at a private fundraiser for House candidate Claudia Tenney in Utica, New York, and a protest was organized during his visit. An estimated 1,700 protesters attended. The City of Utica later tried unsuccessfully to recoup the costs they incurred while hosting Trump, nearly $30 thousand, from the Tenney campaign.

October 2018
October 30 – The visitation of Trump at Tree of Life – Or L'Simcha Congregation in Pittsburgh, following the shooting there 3 days earlier, was greeted by more than 1,000 protesters.

November 2018

November 8 – "Nobody Is Above the Law" protests occur in various cities due to the firing of Attorney General Jeff Sessions.
November 11 – Demonstrations were held at the Place de la République in Paris ahead of Trump's visit to France for events marking the centennial of the end of World War I.
November 30 – A baby Trump blimp, similar to the one in London, was floated outside the Congress in Buenos Aires where the G20 Summit was held.

January 2019
January 19 – Tens of thousands protested during the 2019 Women's March, albeit in smaller numbers compared to previous years, and in spite of both cold weather and controversy over leadership thereof.

February 2019
February 15 – Following Trump's declaration of National Emergency to build a border wall, demonstrators gathered in front of Trump Tower in Manhattan, New York City.
February 18 – Demonstrations were held throughout the country on Presidents' Day, in protest of Trump's declaration of a national emergency.

June 2019
June 3 – Several thousands protest outside of Buckingham Place in the UK where Trump was making a State visit.

September 2019
September 20 – The first day of a week of major global climate strikes served as one of the largest climate mobilizations in US history, with over 1,000 Friday walkout events planned across all 50 states and U.S. territories, protesting the energy policies of the Trump administration.

October 2019
October 27 – President Trump and his wife Melania were booed by baseball fans as they attended the World Series held in Nationals Park in Washington, D.C., while chanting "lock him up!"

November 2019
November 2 – Trump was booed by fans as he attended a UFC fight held in Madison Square Garden in New York.
November 11 – Trump's attendance at the New York City Veterans Day Parade was greeted by both supporters and protesters with the latter calling for impeachment.

December 2019
December 11 – An artwork of Donald Trump alongside that of Philippine president Rodrigo Duterte was displayed at the Bantayog ng mga Bayani in Quezon City in Metro Manila during the protests on International Human Rights day.
December 17 – Nationwide "No One Is Above the Law" rallies called on Congress to vote for impeachment and removal from office; ~500 events in all 50 states

January 2020 
January 18 – The 2020 Women's March in January focused not just on reproductive rights, immigration and climate change, but also on the upcoming 2020 election
January 29 – Swarm The Senate protest takes place in Washington, D.C., demanding witnesses in Trump's trial and lawyer John Bolton to testify.

February 2020
February 5 – Protests against Trump's impeachment trial acquittal occur in various cities.

October 2020
October 17 – The death of US Supreme Court Justice Ruth Bader Ginsburg in mid-September, less than seven weeks before a presidential election, led to a rushed confirmation hearing by the GOP senate majority for Trump's third SCOTUS appointee, conservative judge Amy Coney Barrett, and prompted a second Women's March.

See also
Protests against Barack Obama
Timeline of protests against Hillary Clinton
List of incidents of civil unrest in the United States

References

External links

Articles containing video clips

Protests